Dieudonne Wilfried Seyi Ntsengue (born 23 January 1998) is a Cameroonian professional boxer. As an amateur he competed in the men's middleweight event at the 2016 Summer Olympics. He was defeated by Egypt's Hosam Bakr Abdin in the round of 16. He was the flag bearer for Cameroon for both the Parade of Nations during the opening ceremony and the closing ceremony.

He competed at the 2020 Summer Olympics in the men's middleweight event.

Professional boxing record

References

External links
 

1998 births
Living people
Middleweight boxers
Cameroonian male boxers
Olympic boxers of Cameroon
Boxers at the 2016 Summer Olympics
Place of birth missing (living people)
African Games gold medalists for Cameroon
African Games medalists in boxing
Commonwealth Games medallists in boxing
Commonwealth Games silver medallists for Cameroon
Boxers at the 2018 Commonwealth Games
Competitors at the 2015 African Games
Boxers at the 2020 Summer Olympics
21st-century Cameroonian people
Medallists at the 2018 Commonwealth Games